Conflux is the debut studio album from the Serbian metal band Draconic. The album was recorded in 2002, and released in 2004 through Rock Express Records. Although officially the debut Draconic album, Conflux is basically a project by keyboardist Branislav Stanković. The album features AlogiA members Srđan Branković on guitar, Miroslav Branković on guitar, and Damir Adžić on drums.

Track listing
 "Supernova" - 02:01
 "Stormillenium" - 05:39
 "Jupiter Ceremony" - 05:24
 "Ultimate Astral Messengers / Cosmic Connections" - 11:15
 "Solaris" - 05:03
 "Exordium" - 05:10
 "Zero-Gravity" - 05:00

Personnel
 Branislav Stanković - keyboards, vocals
 Srđan Branković - guitar
 Miroslav Branković - guitar
 Milan Šuput - bass guitar
 Damir Adžić - drums
 Mihaela Gačić - vocals

References 
From the Wrong Side of the Aperture review at Popboks
Interview with David Lazar Galić on Popboks

Draconic albums
2004 debut albums